Deveeri is a 1999 Kannada language film based on the novel Akka by noted Kannada writer P. Lankesh. The novel was adapted for the film by his daughter Kavitha Lankesh.

The film won the 1999–2000 Karnataka State Award for best film.

Cast 
 Nandita Das as Deveeri
 Manjunath as Krishna "Kyaatha"
 Bhavana as Paddi
 Sanketh Kashi as Rangappa
 B. Jayashree as Rangappa's wife
 Deesh Mariwala as Nagara

Reception 
S. Viswanath of Deccan Herald felt that the film lacked a "taut script" and added, "Besides this, there are tacky numbers, with scenes that rarely justify a genre film." He further wrote, "Popular elements have been accommodated into the scheme of things to pander suit to the puerile tastes of to rake in the moolah, with the result the film is stretched a wee long, while, a more aesthetic screenplay would have taken the film to newer realms of novella vogue cinema." However, he commended the film's background score and wrote, "Music director V Manohar lends ample support to Kavitha with excellent, ear-catching background score, enhancing the melancholic mood to the touching tale." While he praised Manjunath's performance in the film in that he had the "maturity of seasoned player, amply justifying Kavitha's faith in the promising lad's abilities", the performance of Nandita Das seemed "unconvincing" to him. He felt that she failed to "add lustre to the film, and her effort comes as a damp-squib." Also writing for Deccan Herald, Aravind Gowda called the film "an exceptionally well-made movie". He felt, "The screenplay, the characters and the story-line, all go well together into making Deveeri a good film to watch." He concluded writing praises of all leading performances in the film.

References

External links
 
 
 

1990s Kannada-language films
Kannada literature
Films directed by Kavitha Lankesh